Anna Zibrandtsen (born 24 April 1994) is a Danish dressage rider. At the European Championships in Gothenburg 2017, she won teamsilver with the stallion Arlando, who was previously competed by Dutch Diederik van Silfhout at the 2016 Olympic Games. She won also several medals with the Danish team at the European Championships for Juniors and Young Riders.

References

Living people
1994 births
Danish female equestrians
Danish dressage riders